Lindita Halimi (born 24 March 1994), commonly known as simply Lindita, is a Kosovo-Albanian singer and songwriter. She rose to fame after winning the sixth edition of Top Fest with "Ëndërroja" (I dreamed) in 2009.

In 2016, she participated in the fifteenth season of American Idol. In 2017, she represented Albania in the Eurovision Song Contest with the song "World", after winning Festivali i Këngës 55. Recognized for her powerful and versatile vocal delivery ranges from screaming to opera singing, Linda has had collaborations with Stevie Wonder in 2013 and Valerie Simpson. She has also opened for the Backstreet Boys.

Early years and career
Lindita Halimi was born in Viti, Kosovo (then part of SFR Yugoslavia), on 24 March 1989. She took part in the third edition of Ethet (Albanian Idol) and reached the Top 10. She has participated in Top Fest twice. In 2009 she won the competition. She has released several singles, mostly ballads. In 2013 she moved to the United States. In December 2014 she returned to take part in the 53rd edition of Festivali i Këngës, where she finished third. She won Festivali i Këngës 55 with the song "Botë", and represented Albania in the Eurovision Song Contest 2017 with the song "World".

Discography

Awards and nominations

Annotations

References

Living people
1989 births
21st-century Albanian women singers
Eurovision Song Contest entrants for Albania
Albanian expatriates in the United States
Eurovision Song Contest entrants of 2017
Kosovan singers
Kosovo Albanians
American Idol participants
People from Viti, Kosovo
Festivali i Këngës winners